In gridiron football, the red zone is the area of the field between the 20-yard line and the goal line. The red zone official meaning is the scoring zone during the process of playing the game and, though some professional stadiums may have a decorative stripe indicating the 20-yard line (usually either team colors, or a red-white-blue stripe; some fields have it placed at the 25-yard line instead), the zone is not red-colored, and merely a statistical delineation. The term is mostly for statistical, psychological, and commercial advertising purposes (radio networks have been known to sell sponsorship of the red zone whenever the home team enters it). It is said to be a place where the chances of scoring are statistically higher.

Being closer to the end zone, play while in the red zone involves closer cramping of the offense and defense. The short field of play means safeties have a smaller area to worry about defending, wide receivers do not have to run as far, and passes are not thrown as far. Though the distance to the goal line is less than other parts of the field, with all defenders being crammed into a smaller space and having less room to worry about defending, advancing the ball and ultimately scoring may be more difficult. 

The player spacing issues are less of a factor in Canadian football, where the end zones are significantly deeper and wider than in American football.

For all but the weakest amateur kickers, the red zone is universally within field goal range, assuring that points will be scored on a drive unless the team on offense commits a turnover, or a field goal is blocked or missed. As a result, ball control is a greater priority in most red zone situations.

In the "Kansas Playoff" method of settling ties, play starts just outside the red zone, at the 25-yard line, thus most plays in that method occur in the red zone as the ball is advanced.
While the term “red zone” is often attributed to Joe Gibbs, the term was used by Steve Eskey as early as 1979.

References

American football terminology
Canadian football terminology